The 2012 Washington Republican presidential caucuses were held on March 3, 2012. Since 1992, the Washington Republicans have used a presidential preferential primary in addition to the caucuses. The 2012 primary was, however, canceled for budgetary reasons, as was the one in 2004.

Caucus system

The initial caucuses were held on March 3, 2012, with voters reporting to caucus locations by precinct. However, the caucuses did not allocate delegates to the different candidates, they did only elected delegates to the county conventions and took part in a nonbinding strawpoll. County conventions convened all through March and April, each picking delegates to the state conventions who was not bound to any particular candidate either. The state convention was held on May 31-June 2, 2012. At that time, state delegates to the national convention was legally bound to specific candidates.

Results

With 3,677,919 registered voters as of February 29, the turnout was 1.4%.

Controversy at 37th Legislative District Caucus

The 37th Legislative District covers parts of King County,  and the Republican caucus for the district was held Saturday, April 21 at Dimmitt Middle School.  The caucus was broken up by King County Republican Party Chairman Lori Sotelo after the caucus elected Ron Paul supporter Tamra Smilanich as chair.  Sotelo declared that the caucus was no longer a Party event, but had become a Ron Paul Campaign event, and that the attendees would have to vacate the building.  As Smilanich attempted to conduct business, Sotelo stated to the caucus, "The Ron Paul campaign does not have authority to rent this space.  They have not provided insurance for this building", and (addressing Smilanich) "You do not have authority to run the meeting in this building.  You will have ten minutes before this building must be vacated, Tamra."    The caucus was moved outside at about 12:30 pm, business was resumed, and delegates to the April 28 county convention were elected, all eleven of those being Paul supporters.  Each caucus-goer had been required to pay a $10 fee to attend the caucus, Sotelo saying that the fee was to help pay for the party's expenses for using the school.  Sotelo refused to refund the $10 fees after the caucus was moved outside.

Conventions
There was no formal system of allocating delegates to candidates before the state convention. At each meeting before the convention, the participants decided the best course of action for electing delegates. The 40 elected delegates at the state convention are legally bound to vote for their stated presidential preference as of the convention on the first ballot at the Republican National Convention. There was not, however, any obligation to align with the results of the presidential preference poll results. The 3 automatic (RNC) delegates are not legally bound to vote for a candidate.
 17 March - 21 April: County convention and legislative district caucuses elected delegates to the state convention.
 31 May - 2 June: State convention as a whole elected 10 National Convention delegates. Delegates from each of the ten congressional district caucused separately to elect 3 National Convention delegates each.

The multiple layers (and time between them) complicated estimates of eventual national delegate numbers. Delegates who did not show up for the county conventions was replaced by alternates who may have favored completely different candidates. At the time of the state convention the only two candidates still running an active campaign was Romney and Paul. The day before the convention Santorum urged his supporters to back Romney resulting in an unified convention electing a large majority of the delegates to be bound for Romney, at this time the presumptive nominee. He should only have been allocated 15 delegates if this had been a primary allocating delegates, but 34 delegates bound to him were elected at the convention. Paul, the other active campaigning candidate, on the other hand would have expected 10 delegates in a projected count but only 5 delegates bound to him were elected.

See also
 2012 Republican Party presidential debates and forums
 2012 Republican Party presidential primaries
 Results of the 2012 Republican Party presidential primaries

References

Washington
2012 Washington (state) elections
2012